Andrés Eduardo Montero Cárdenas (born 5 March 1994) is a Venezuelan footballer who last played for Envigado as an attacking midfielder.

Career
After playing for several clubs from his native country, even at the Copa Libertadores along with Carabobo on 2018, and a short-term experience in Europe playing for Albanian club Luftëtari on 2016, he joined Chilean club Coquimbo Unido on 2020 season, playing also at the 2020 Copa Sudamericana.

On 2 November 2020, he left Coquimbo Unido by mutual agreement because he decided to return to Venezuela.

Career statistics

Club

Notes

Honours

Club
Deportivo Lara
 Primera División (1): 2017–C

Deportivo Táchira
 Friendlies (1): 2019 Cuadrangular Internacional Copa 45 Años

References

External links
 

1994 births
Living people
Venezuelan footballers
Venezuelan expatriate footballers
Association football midfielders
Zulia F.C. players
Luftëtari Gjirokastër players
Asociación Civil Deportivo Lara players
Carabobo F.C. players
Deportivo Táchira F.C. players
Coquimbo Unido footballers
Deportivo Pasto footballers
Zamora FC players
Envigado F.C. players
Venezuelan Primera División players
Kategoria Superiore players
Chilean Primera División players
Categoría Primera A players
Venezuelan expatriate sportspeople in Albania
Venezuelan expatriate sportspeople in Chile
Venezuelan expatriate sportspeople in Colombia
Expatriate footballers in Albania
Expatriate footballers in Chile
Expatriate footballers in Colombia
Sportspeople from Maracaibo